The 2010 Asian Junior Women's Volleyball Championship was held in Ho Chi Minh City, Vietnam from 12 September to 20 September 2010.

Pools composition
The teams are seeded based on their final ranking at the 2008 Asian Junior Women's Volleyball Championship.

Preliminary round

Pool A

|}

|}

Pool B

|}

|}

Pool C

|}

|}

Pool D

|}

|}

Classification round
 The results and the points of the matches between the same teams that were already played during the preliminary round shall be taken into account for the classification round.

Pool E

|}

|}

Pool F

|}

|}

Pool G

|}

|}

Pool H

|}

|}

Classification 13th–15th

Semifinals

|}

13th place

|}

Classification 9th–12th

Semifinals

|}

11th place

|}

9th place

|}

Final round

Quarterfinals

|}

5th–8th semifinals

|}

Semifinals

|}

7th place

|}

5th place

|}

3rd place

|}

Final

|}

Final standing

Team Roster
Liu Yanhan, Liu Mingjuan, Yang Jie, Wu Bei, Zhang Xiaoya, Zhang Zhongyu, Huang Liuyan, Jiang Qianwen, Lin Li, Yang Zhou, Wang Qi, Wang Ning
Head Coach: Xu Jiande

Awards
MVP:  Liu Yanhan
Best Scorer:  Park Jeong-ah
Best Spiker:  Mari Horikawa
Best Blocker:  Yang Zhou
Best Server:  Mari Horikawa
Best Setter:  Wu Bei
Best Libero:  Sumiko Mori
Miss Volleyball:  Azusa Futami

External links
www.asianvolleyball.org

A
V
V
Asian women's volleyball championships
Asian Junior